The South Fork Malheur River is tributary of the Malheur River in a sparsely populated part of the U.S. state of Oregon. Arising southeast of the unincorporated community of New Princeton and slightly north of Oregon Route 78, it flows generally northeast to meet the Malheur near the unincorporated community of Riverside in Malheur County. The South Fork enters the larger river  by water from its confluence with the Snake River.

Tributaries
Named tributaries of the South Fork from source to mouth are Camp, Indian, Deadman, Pole, Crane, and Swamp creeks. Then Coleman, Coyote, Cobb, Visher, Buck, McEwen, Hot Springs, and Granite creeks.

See also
 List of rivers of Oregon

References

External links
 Malheur Watershed Council

Rivers of Oregon
Rivers of Harney County, Oregon
Rivers of Malheur County, Oregon